Bogert's emo skink (Emoia bogerti) is a species of lizard in the family Scincidae. The species is native to Indonesia.

Etymology
The specific name, bogerti, is in honor of American herpetologist Charles Mitchill Bogert. (1908-1992), former curator of the Department of Herpetology of the American Museum of Natural History.

Geographic range
E. bogerti is endemic to Western New Guinea (also known as Papua), Indonesia.

Habitat

Description
E. bogerti may attain a snout-to-vent length (SVL) of almost . Dorsally, it is light brown, with darker brown lines. Ventrally, it is gray.

Reproduction
E. bogerti is oviparous. Clutch size is two eggs.

References

Further reading
Brown WC (1953). "Results of the Archbold Expeditions. No. 69, A Review of New Guinea Lizards Allied to Emoia baudini and Emoia physicae (Scincidae)". American Museum Novitates (1627): 1–25. (Emoia submetallica bogerti, new subspecies, pp. 18–20, Figure 6f).
Brown WC (1991). "Lizards of the Genus Emoia (Scincidae) with Observations on Their Evolution and Biogeography". Memoirs of the California Academy of Sciences (15): i–vi, 1–94. (Emoia bogerti, new status, p. 27).

Emoia
Reptiles described in 1953
Reptiles of Indonesia
Endemic fauna of Indonesia
Taxa named by Walter Creighton Brown